Sania Mirza and Yaroslava Shvedova won the title, defeating Olga Govortsova and Alla Kudryavtseva 6–3, 6–3 in the final.

Seeds

Draw

Draw

References
 Main Draw

Citi Open - Doubles